The 2003 Ebonyi State House of Assembly election was held on May 3, 2003, to elect members of the Ebonyi State House of Assembly in Nigeria. All the 24 seats were up for election in the Ebonyi State House of Assembly.

Results

Izzi West 
PDP candidate Sylvester Nwankwo won the election.

Onicha East 
PDP candidate Patrick Edediugwu won the election.

Ezza North West 
PDP candidate Emmanuel Nwobo won the election.

Afikpo North West 
PDP candidate Christopher Omo Isu won the election.

Ebonyi North West 
PDP candidate Kenneth Ochigbo won the election.

Ezza South 
PDP candidate Tobias Okwuru won the election.

Ohaozara West 
PDP candidate Anthony Onu won the election.

Ezza North East 
PDP candidate won the election.

Afikpo South West 
PDP candidate Ugorji Ama Oti won the election.

Izzi East 
PDP candidate Simon Iseh won the election.

Abakaliki North 
PDP candidate Fabian Muoneke won the election.

Ikwo North 
PDP candidate James Alaka won the election.

Ohaukwu South 
PDP candidate Onwe S. Onwe won the election.

Ebonyi North East 
PDP candidate Sabinus Nwankwegu won the election.

Afikpo South East 
PDP candidate Ben Oko Obasi won the election.

Ikwo South 
PDP candidate Nweke Clement won the election.

Ishielu South 
PDP candidate Peter Ede won the election.

Ivo 
PDP candidate Paul Ogbonnia won the election.

Ohaozara East 
PDP candidate Sunday Chukwu won the election.

Ohaukwu North 
PDP candidate Bernard Uzim Nwankwo won the election.

Onicha West 
PDP candidate Uzor Chigbo won the election.

Abakaliki South 
PDP candidate Fidelis Ogodo won the election.

Ishielu North 
PDP candidate Nwachukwu Johnson won the election.

Afikpo North East 
PDP candidate Arinze Egwu won the election.

References 

Ebonyi State
House of Assembly elections in Nigeria by state